The 2007 Southern Conference baseball tournament was held at Joseph P. Riley Jr. Park in Charleston, South Carolina, from May 20 through 24. Ninth seeded  won the tournament and earned the Southern Conference's automatic bid to the 2007 NCAA Division I baseball tournament. It was the Terrier's first SoCon tournament win.

All ten baseball programs in the conference participated in the tournament, with the seventh through tenth place teams playing a single-elimination opening day prior to an 8-team, double-elimination tournament.

Seeding

Results 
Pairings
Results

Play-In Round

Bracket

All-Tournament Team

References 

Tournament
Southern Conference Baseball Tournament
SoCon baseball tournament
Southern Conference baseball tournament